Roger Drake may refer to:

 Roger Drake (colonial administrator), administrator of the English East India Company, President of Bengal, 1752–1756
 Roger Drake (physician) (1608–1669), English physician and Presbyterian minister
 Roger Drake, the founder and CEO of Drakes Supermarkets